American Samoa competed at the 2020 Summer Olympics in Tokyo. Originally scheduled to take place from 24 July to 9 August 2020, the Games have been postponed to 23 July to 8 August 2021, because of the COVID-19 pandemic. It was the nation's ninth consecutive appearance at the Summer Olympics.

Competitors

The following is the list of number of competitors in the Games.

Athletics

American Samoa received a universality slot from the World Athletics to send a male track and field athlete to the Olympics.

Track & road events

Sailing

American Samoan sailors qualified one boat in each of the following classes through the class-associated World Championships, and the continental regattas, marking the country's recurrence to the sport for the first time since Atlanta 1996.

M = Medal race; EL = Eliminated – did not advance into the medal race

Swimming

American Samoa received a universality invitation from FINA to send two top-ranked swimmers (one per gender) in their respective individual events to the Olympics, based on the FINA Points System of June 28, 2021.

Weightlifting

American Samoa receiving one tripartite invitation quotas from International Weightlifting Federation.

References

Nations at the 2020 Summer Olympics
2020
2021 in American Samoan sports